Blepephaeus subannulatus is a species of beetle in the family Cerambycidae. It was described by Stephan von Breuning in 1979. The species is known from China.

References

Blepephaeus
Beetles described in 1979